The Byton K-Byte is an all-electric battery-powered sedan concept car by Chinese-German company Byton. It was publicly unveiled at the 2018 Consumer Electronics Show Asia CES, but neither the Byton K-Byte or M-Byte was manufactured due to the bankruptcy of Byton.

Gallery

See also

 Mercedes-Benz EQA
 Tesla Model S
 Tesla Model 3
 Polestar 2
 Xpeng P7
 Geometry A
 BYD Han EV
 BYD Qin Pro EV500
 Aion S

References

K-Byte
Electric concept cars